Queen Margot is a Franco-Belgian graphic novel series written by Olivier Cadic and François Gheysens, illustrated by Juliette Derenne and published by Chapeau Bas (Cinebook French Imprint) in French and Cinebook in English. Queen Margot is about the life of Margaret of Valois, who was Queen of France from 1589 to 1599.

Volumes
 Le Duc de Guise – May 2006 
 Le roi de Navarre – April 2007 
 Le comte de la mole – May 2008

Translations
Cinebook Ltd published Queen Margot. The three albums have been released:

 The Age of Innocence – July 2006 
 The Bloody Wedding – April 2007 
 Endangered Love – May 2008

References

Bandes dessinées
Belgian comic strips
Fictional queens
Comics about women
Drama comics
2006 comics debuts
Comics characters introduced in 2006
Comics set in the 17th century
Belgian comics characters
Female characters in comics